Motiliproteus is a bacteria genus from the family of Oceanospirillaceae, with one known species (Motiliproteus sediminis).

References

Oceanospirillales
Monotypic bacteria genera
Bacteria genera